James Meredith (born 1933) was the first African-American student at the University of Mississippi.

James Meredith may also refer to:

James Meredith (Medal of Honor) (1872–1915), United States Marine sergeant and Medal of Honor recipient
James Meredith (soccer) (born 1988), Australian soccer player
James Creed Meredith (1875–1942), Irish lawyer and judge
James Creed Meredith (baronet) (1842–1912), Irish Freemason
James Hargrove Meredith (1914–1988), U.S. federal judge
Jamon Meredith (James Jamon Meredith, born 1986), American football player
Ted Meredith (James Edwin Meredith, 1891–1957), American Olympic runner

See also
Meredith (surname)